Turks in Ukraine are people of Turkish ethnicity living in Ukraine. The first Turkish settlement started during the Ottoman rule of Ukraine. In addition, there has been modern migration to the country largely formed of Meskhetian Turks, followed by immigrants from Turkey and Turkish communities from other post-Ottoman territories, such as Turkish Cypriots from Northern Cyprus.

History

Ottoman migration

The First All-Union Census of the Soviet Union in 1926 recorded 8,570 Ottoman Turks living in the Soviet Union. The Ottoman Turks are no longer listed separately in the census, it is presumed that those who were living in Ukraine have either been assimilated into Ukrainian society or have left the country.

Meskhetian Turks migration

The majority of Turkish Meskhetians arrived in the eastern region of Ukraine in 1989-90 as persecuted refugees who had experienced two deportations; the first from Georgia in 1944, and then Uzbekistan in 1989-90. Initially, they were forced to leave their homeland in the Meskheti region of Georgia when the Soviet Union was preparing to launch a pressure campaign against Turkey. Nationalistic policies at the time encouraged the slogan: "Georgia for Georgians" and that the Meskhetian Turks should be sent to Turkey "where they belong". Joseph Stalin deported the majority of Meskhetian Turks to Uzbekistan, thousands dying en route in cattle-trucks, however, in 1989, the Meskhetian Turks in Uzbekistan became the victims of riots by the ethnic Uzbeks. Thus, the majority of the Turkish Meskhetian community were deported for a second time, many coming to Ukraine during 1989-1990 following ethnic persecution in the Ferghana Valley. Others followed later to re-unite with their relatives. The majority mostly settled in Crimea, Donetsk, Kherson, and Mykolaiv. A few live in Kyiv. In 1991, they were granted Ukrainian citizenship.

Mainland Turkish migration
Ukraine has witnessed increasing numbers of immigrants from Turkey. By 2009, 5,394 Turkish citizens were living in Ukraine. Prior to the 2022 Russian invasion of Ukraine, the number of Turkish citizens had increased to around 20,000.

Turkish Cypriot migration
In the twenty-first century, Turkish Cypriots have arrived in Ukraine both as temporary and permanent residents.

Demographics 
According to the  2001 Ukrainian Census, 8,844 were recorded as "Turks" and 336 people were recorded as "Meskhetian Turks". Of those who were recorded only as "Turks", the majority lived in Kherson (3,736), Donetsk (1,791), Crimea (969) and Mykolaiv Oblast (758).

In 2018, the number of Meskhetian Turks alone numbered approximately 15,000.

Census history

Religion 

Opened in 2005, the Sultan Suleiman Mosque was also built in Mariupol and named after the Ottoman sultan Suleiman the Magnificent. It was built by a Turkish Businessman (Salih Cihan). Five times prayers along with the Friday Prayers are offered at the mosque. During the 2022 Russian invasion of Ukraine, at least 300 Turks, and hundreds more family members (without Turkish citizenship), were trapped in Mariupol; at least 150 people took refuge in the Sultan Suleiman Mosque. The mosque is run by Turkey’s Directorate of Religious Affairs.

Education 
The Simferopol International School opened by Turkish entrepreneurs in the Autonomous Republic of Crimea in Ukraine has been listed the top school in the list of the country’s best 100 schools. Turkish, English, Crimean Tatar, and French are taught at the school. In the third year since its establishment, the school has achieved several successes in the Olympics held in the city and across the country. The Turkish school also won a bronze medal in the International Environmental Project Olympics (INEPO) held in Turkey. Turkish Parliament Speaker of the time, Cemil Çiçek had visited Meridian International School founded by Turkish entrepreneurs in Ukrainian capital Kyiv on April 4, 2013.

2022 Russian invasion of Ukraine
Upon the 2022 Russian invasion of Ukraine, nearly 9,000 Turks with Turkish citizenship were reported to have evacuated the country by 3rd March, having arrived in Turkey with Turkish Airlines flights from Warsaw and Bucharest.

On February 25, 2022, the Ministry of Foreign Affairs of Northern Cyprus strongly recommended all Turkish Cypriot citizens to leave Ukraine. Assistance was provided at the TRNC Representative Office in Budapest.

On March 17, 2022, the Turkish Foreign Minister, Mevlüt Çavuşoğlu, announced that Turkey had evacuated 15,196 Turkish citizens since the start of the war. Among them were Meskhetian Turks who had already acquired Turkish citizenship, having previously settled in the Üzümlü district of Erzincan in 2015 due to the 2014 Annexation of Crimea by the Russian Federation. Some of these Meskhetian Turks from Erzincan had later returned to Ukraine; thus, the 2022 evacuation back to Turkey has meant that "some of them have seen three deportations in their lifetime."

Notable people 
Miray Akay, actress (Turkish father) 
Elvira Kamaloğlu, female wrestling champion (Turkish Meskhetian origin)
Vasily Kapnist, playwright and nobleman (Turkish mother)
Alemdar Karamanov, composer (Turkish father) 
Dzhemal Kyzylatesh, football player 
Emre Manuila, football player 
Irma St. Paule, actress (Turkish father)

Gallery 
Ottoman architecture in Ukraine

See also 
Turkey–Ukraine relations
Crimea
Izmail
Turks in Russia

References

Bibliography

.
.
.
.
.
 .
.
 .
 .

 
Ukraine
Ukraine
Ukraine
Ethnic groups in Ukraine
Islam in Ukraine
Muslim communities in Europe